DC Comics, Inc. (doing business as DC) is an American comic book publisher and the flagship unit of DC Entertainment, a subsidiary of Warner Bros. Discovery.

DC Comics is one of the largest and oldest American comic book companies, with their first comic under the DC banner being published in 1937. The majority of its publications take place within the fictional DC Universe and feature numerous culturally iconic heroic characters, such as Superman, Batman, Wonder Woman, Flash, Aquaman, Green Lantern, and Cyborg; as well as famous fictional teams including the Justice League, the Justice Society of America, the Justice League Dark, the Doom Patrol, and the Teen Titans. The universe also features an assortment of well-known supervillains such as Lex Luthor, the Joker, the Cheetah, the Reverse-Flash, Black Manta, Sinestro, and Darkseid. The company has published non-DC Universe-related material, including Watchmen, V for Vendetta, Fables and many titles under their alternative imprint Vertigo and now DC Black Label.

Originally in Manhattan at 432 Fourth Avenue, the DC Comics offices have been located at 480 and later 575 Lexington Avenue; 909 Third Avenue; 75 Rockefeller Plaza; 666 Fifth Avenue; and 1325 Avenue of the Americas. DC had its headquarters at 1700 Broadway, Midtown Manhattan, New York City, but DC Entertainment relocated its headquarters to Burbank, California in April 2015.

Penguin Random House Publisher Services distributes DC Comics' books to the bookstore market, while Diamond Comic Distributors supplied the comics shop direct market until June 2020, when Lunar Distribution and UCS Comic Distributors, who already dominated direct market distribution on account of the disruption to Diamond that resulted from the COVID-19 pandemic, replaced Diamond to distribute to that market. 

DC Comics and its longtime major competitor Marvel Comics (acquired in 2009 by The Walt Disney Company, Warner Bros. Discovery's main competitor) together shared approximately 70% of the American comic book market in 2017, though this number may give a distorted view since graphic novels are excluded. With the sales of all books included, DC is the second biggest publisher, after Viz Media, and Marvel is third.

History

National Comics Publications

Golden Age 

Entrepreneur Major Malcolm Wheeler-Nicholson founded National Allied Publications in Autumn 1934 intended as an American comic book publishing company. The first publishing of the company debuted with the tabloid-sized New Fun: The Big Comic Magazine #1 (the first of a comic series later called More Fun Comics) with a cover date of February 1935. It was an anthology title essentially for original stories not reprinted from newspaper strips, unlike many comic book series before it. While superhero comics are what DC Comics is known for throughout modern times, the genres in the first anthology titles consisted of funnies, Western comics and adventure-related stories. The character Doctor Occult, created by Jerry Siegel and Joe Shuster in December 1935 with issue No. 6 of New Fun Comics, is considered the earliest recurring superhero created by DC who is still used. The company created a second recurring title called New Comics No. 1, released in December 1935, which was the start of the long-running Adventure Comics series featuring many anthology titles as well.

Wheeler-Nicholson's next and final title, Detective Comics, advertised with a cover illustration dated December 1936, eventually premiered three months late with a March 1937 cover date. The themed anthology that revolved originally around fictional detective stories became in modern times the longest-running ongoing comic series. A notable debut in the first issue was Slam Bradley, created in a collaboration between Malcolm Wheeler-Nicholson, Jerry Siegel and Joe Shuster. In 1937, in debt to printing-plant owner and magazine distributor Harry Donenfeld — who also published pulp magazines and operated as a principal in the magazine distributorship Independent News — Wheeler-Nicholson had to take Donenfeld on as a partner to publish Detective Comics No. 1. Detective Comics, Inc. (which would help inspire the abbreviation DC) was formed, with Wheeler-Nicholson and Jack S. Liebowitz, Donenfeld's accountant, listed as owners. Major Wheeler-Nicholson remained for a year, but cash-flow problems continued, and he was forced out. Shortly afterwards, Detective Comics, Inc. purchased the remains of National Allied, also known as Nicholson Publishing, at a bankruptcy auction.

Meanwhile, Max Gaines formed the sister company All-American Publications around 1938. Detective Comics, Inc. soon launched a new anthology title, entitled Action Comics. Issue#1, cover dated June 1938, first featured characters such as Superman by Siegel and Shuster, Zatara by Fred Guardineer and Tex Thompson by Ken Finch and Bernard Baily. It is considered to be the first comic book to feature the new character archetype, soon known as "superheroes", and was a sales hit bringing to life a new age of comic books, with the credit going to the first appearance of Superman both being featured on the cover and within the issue. It is now one of the most expensive and valuable comic book issues of all time. The issue's first featured tale which starred Superman was the first to feature an origin story of superheroes with the reveal of an unnamed planet, later known as Krypton, that he is said to be from. The issue also contained the first essential supporting character and one of the earliest essential female characters in comics with Lois Lane as Superman's first depicted romantic interest. The Green Hornet-inspired character known as the Crimson Avenger by Jim Chamber was featured in Detective Comics No. 20 (October 1938). The character makes a distinction of being the first masked vigilante published by DC. An unnamed "office boy" retconned as Jimmy Olsen's first appearance was revealed in Action Comics #6's (November 1938) Superman story by Siegel and Shuster.

Starting in 1939, Siegel and Shuster's Superman would be the first comic-derived character to appear outside of comic magazines and later appear in newspaper strips starring himself, which first introduced Superman's biological parents, Jor-El and Lara. All-American Publications' first comic series called All-American Comics was first published in April 1939. The series Detective Comics would make successful history as first featuring Batman by Bob Kane and Bill Finger in issue#27 (March 1939) with the request of more superhero titles. Batman was depicted as a masked vigilante wearing a caped suit known as the Batsuit, along with riding a car that would later be referred to as the Batmobile. Also within the Batman story was the supporting character, James Gordon, Police commissioner of what later would be Gotham City Police Department. Despite being a parody, All-American Publications introduced the earliest female character who would later be a female superhero called Red Tornado (though disguised as a male) in Ma Hunkel who first appeared in the "Scribbly" stories in All-American Comics No. 3 (June 1939). Another important Batman debut was the introduction of the fictional mansion known as Wayne Manor first seen in Detective Comics No. 28 (June 1939). The series Adventure Comics would eventually follow in the footsteps of Action Comics and Detective Comics, featuring a new recurring superhero. The superhero called Sandman was first written in issue No. 40 (cover date: July 1939). Action Comics No. 13 (June 1939) introduced the first recurring Superman enemy referred to as the Ultra-Humanite first introduced by Siegel and Shuster, commonly cited as one of the earliest supervillains in comic books. The character Superman had another breakthrough when he was given his own comic book, which was unheard of at the time. The first issue, introduced in June 1939, helped directly introduce Superman's adoptive parents, Jonathan and Martha Kent, by Siegel and Shuster. Detective Comics #29 (July 1939) introduced the Batman's utility belt by Gardner Fox. Outside of DC's publishing, a character later integrated as DC was introduced by Fox Feature Syndicate named the Blue Beetle released in August 1939. Fictional cities would be a common theme of DC. The first revealed city was Superman's home city, Metropolis, that was originally named in Action Comics No. 16 in September 1939. Detective Comics No. 31 in September 1939 by Gardner Fox, Bob Kane and Sheldon Moldoff introduced a romantic interest of Batman named Julie Madison, the weapon known as the Batarang that Batman commonly uses, and the fictional aircraft called the Batplane. Batman's origin would first be shown in Detective Comics No. 33 (Nov. 1939) first depicting the death of Thomas Wayne and Martha Wayne by a mugger. The origin story would remain crucial for the fictional character since the inception.
The Daily Planet (a common setting of Superman) was first named in a Superman newspaper strip around November 1939. The superhero Doll Man was the first superhero by Quality, which DC now owns. Fawcett Comics was formed around 1939 and would become DC's original competitor company in the next decade.

National Allied Publications soon merged with Detective Comics, Inc., forming National Comics Publications on September 30, 1946. National Comics Publications absorbed an affiliated concern, Max Gaines' and Liebowitz' All-American Publications. In the same year Gaines let Liebowitz buy him out, and kept only Picture Stories from the Bible as the foundation of his own new company, EC Comics. At that point, "Liebowitz promptly orchestrated the merger of All-American and Detective Comics into National Comics... Next he took charge of organizing National Comics, [the self-distributorship] Independent News, and their affiliated firms into a single corporate entity, National Periodical Publications". National Periodical Publications became publicly traded on the stock market in 1961.

Despite the official names "National Comics" and "National Periodical Publications", the company began branding itself as "Superman-DC" as early as 1940, and the company became known colloquially as DC Comics for years before the official adoption of that name in 1977.

The company began to move aggressively against what it saw as copyright-violating imitations from other companies, such as Fox Comics' Wonder Man, which (according to court testimony) Fox started as a copy of Superman. This extended to DC suing Fawcett Comics over Captain Marvel, at the time comics' top-selling character (see National Comics Publications, Inc. v. Fawcett Publications, Inc.). Faced with declining sales and the prospect of bankruptcy if it lost, Fawcett capitulated in 1953 and ceased publishing comics. Years later, Fawcett sold the rights for Captain Marvel to DC—which in 1972 revived Captain Marvel in the new title Shazam! featuring artwork by his creator, C. C. Beck. In the meantime, the abandoned trademark had been seized by Marvel Comics in 1967, with the creation of their Captain Marvel, forbidding the DC comic itself to be called that. While Captain Marvel did not recapture his old popularity, he later appeared in a Saturday morning live action TV adaptation and gained a prominent place in the mainstream continuity DC calls the DC Universe.

When the popularity of superheroes faded in the late 1940s, the company focused on such genres as science fiction, Westerns, humor, and romance. DC also published crime and horror titles, but relatively tame ones, and thus avoided the mid-1950s backlash against such comics. A handful of the most popular superhero-titles, including Action Comics and Detective Comics, the medium's two longest-running titles, continued publication.

Silver Age 

In the mid-1950s, editorial director Irwin Donenfeld and publisher Liebowitz directed editor Julius Schwartz (whose roots lay in the science-fiction book market) to produce a one-shot Flash story in the try-out title Showcase. Instead of reviving the old character, Schwartz had writers Robert Kanigher and John Broome, penciler Carmine Infantino, and inker Joe Kubert create an entirely new super-speedster, updating and modernizing the Flash's civilian identity, costume, and origin with a science-fiction bent. The Flash's reimagining in Showcase No. 4 (October 1956) proved sufficiently popular that it soon led to a similar revamping of the Green Lantern character, the introduction of the modern all-star team Justice League of America (JLA), and many more superheroes, heralding what historians and fans call the Silver Age of Comic Books.

National did not reimagine its continuing characters (primarily Superman, Batman, and Wonder Woman), but radically overhauled them. The Superman family of titles, under editor Mort Weisinger, introduced such enduring characters as Supergirl, Bizarro, and Brainiac. The Batman titles, under editor Jack Schiff, introduced the successful Batwoman, Bat-Girl, Ace the Bat-Hound, and Bat-Mite in an attempt to modernize the strip with non-science-fiction elements. Schwartz, together with artist Infantino, then revitalized Batman in what the company promoted as the "New Look", with relatively down-to-Earth stories re-emphasizing Batman as a detective. Meanwhile, editor Kanigher successfully introduced a whole family of Wonder Woman characters having fantastic adventures in a mythological context.

Since the 1940s, when Superman, Batman, and many of the company's other heroes began appearing in stories together, DC's characters inhabited a shared continuity that, decades later, was dubbed the "DC Universe" by fans. With the story "Flash of Two Worlds", in Flash No. 123 (September 1961), editor Schwartz (with writer Gardner Fox and artists Infantino and Joe Giella) introduced a concept that allowed slotting the 1930s and 1940s Golden Age heroes into this continuity via the explanation that they lived on an other-dimensional "Earth 2", as opposed to the modern heroes' "Earth 1"—in the process creating the foundation for what was later called the DC Multiverse.

National Periodical Publications 
DC's introduction of the reimagined superheroes did not go unnoticed by other comics companies. In 1961, with DC's JLA as the specific spur, Marvel Comics writer-editor Stan Lee and a robust creator Jack Kirby ushered in the sub-Silver Age "Marvel Age" of comics with the debut issue of The Fantastic Four. Reportedly, DC ignored the initial success of Marvel with this editorial change until its consistently strengthening sales, albeit also benefiting Independent News' business as their distributor as well, made that impossible. That commercial situation especially applied with Marvel's superior sell-through percentage numbers which were typically 70% to DC's roughly 50%, which meant DC's publications were barely making a profit in comparison after returns from the distributors were calculated while Marvel was making an excellent profit by comparison.

However, the senior DC staff were reportedly at a loss at this time to understand how this small publishing house was achieving this increasingly threatening commercial strength. For instance, when Marvel's product was examined in a meeting, Marvel's emphasis on more sophisticated character-based narrative and artist-driven visual storytelling was apparently ignored for self-deluding guesses at the brand's popularity which included superficial reasons like the presence of the color red or word balloons on the cover, or that the perceived crudeness of the interior art was somehow more appealing to readers. When Lee learned about DC's subsequent experimental attempts to imitate these perceived details, he amused himself by arranging direct defiance of those assumptions in Marvel's publications as sales strengthened further to frustrate the competition.

However, this ignorance of Marvel's true appeal did not extend to some of the writing talent during this period, from which there were some attempts to emulate Marvel's narrative approach. For instance, there was the Doom Patrol series by Arnold Drake, a writer who previously warned the management of the new rival's strength; a superhero team of outsiders who resented their freakish powers, which Drake later speculated was plagiarized by Stan Lee to create The X-Men. There was also the young Jim Shooter who purposely emulated Marvel's writing when he wrote for DC after much study of both companies' styles, such as for the Legion of Super-Heroes feature. In 1966, National Periodical Publications had set up its own television arm, led by Allen Ducovny to develop and produce projects for television, with Superman TV Corporation to handle its television distribution of NPP's TV shows.

A 1966 Batman TV show on the ABC network sparked a temporary spike in comic book sales, and a brief fad for superheroes in Saturday morning animation (Filmation created most of DC's initial cartoons) and other media. DC significantly lightened the tone of many DC comics—particularly Batman and Detective Comics—to better complement the "camp" tone of the TV series. This tone coincided with the famous "Go-Go Checks" checkerboard cover-dress which featured a black-and-white checkerboard strip (all DC books cover dated February 1966 until August 1967) at the top of each comic, a misguided attempt by then-managing editor Irwin Donenfeld to make DC's output "stand out on the newsracks". In particular, DC artist, Carmine Infantino, complained that the visual cover distinctiveness made DC's titles easier for readers to see and then avoid in favor of Marvel's titles.

In 1967, Batman artist Infantino (who had designed popular Silver Age characters Batgirl and the Phantom Stranger) rose from art director to become DC's editorial director. With the growing popularity of upstart rival Marvel Comics threatening to topple DC from its longtime number-one position in the comics industry, he attempted to infuse the company with more focus towards marketing new and existing titles and characters with more adult sensibilities towards an emerging older age group of superhero comic book fans that grew out of Marvel's efforts to market their superhero line to college-aged adults. He also recruited major talents such as ex-Marvel artist and Spider-Man co-creator Steve Ditko and promising newcomers Neal Adams and Denny O'Neil and replaced some existing DC editors with artist-editors, including Joe Kubert and Dick Giordano, to give DC's output a more artistic critical eye.

Kinney National/Warner Communications (1967–1990) 
In 1967, National Periodical Publications was purchased by Kinney National Company, which purchased Warner Bros.-Seven Arts in 1969. Kinney National spun off its non-entertainment assets in 1972 (as National Kinney Corporation) and changed its name to Warner Communications Inc.

In 1970, Jack Kirby moved from Marvel Comics to DC, at the end of the Silver Age of Comics, in which Kirby's contributions to Marvel played a large, integral role. Given carte blanche to write and illustrate his own stories, he created a handful of thematically-linked series he called collectively "The Fourth World". In the existing series Superman's Pal Jimmy Olsen and in his own, newly-launched series New Gods, Mister Miracle, and The Forever People, Kirby introduced such enduring characters and concepts as arch-villain Darkseid and the other-dimensional realm Apokolips. Furthermore, Kirby intended their stories to be reprinted in collected editions, in a publishing format that was later called the trade paperback, which became a standard industry practice decades later. While sales were respectable, they did not meet DC management's initially high expectations, and also suffered from a lack of comprehension and internal support from Infantino. By 1973 the "Fourth World" was all cancelled, although Kirby's conceptions soon became integral to the broadening of the DC Universe, especially after the major toy-company, Kenner Products, judged them ideal for their action-figure adaptation of the DC Universe, the Super Powers Collection. Obligated by his contract, Kirby created other unrelated series for DC, including Kamandi, The Demon, and OMAC, before ultimately returning to Marvel Comics in 1976.

Bronze Age 

Following the science-fiction innovations of the Silver Age, the comics of the 1970s and 1980s became known as the Bronze Age, as fantasy gave way to more naturalistic and sometimes darker themes. Illegal drug use, banned by the Comics Code Authority, explicitly appeared in comics for the first time in Marvel Comics' story "Green Goblin Reborn!" in The Amazing Spider-Man No. 96 (May 1971), and after the Code's updating in response, DC offered a drug-fueled storyline in writer Dennis O'Neil and artist Neal Adams' Green Lantern, beginning with the story "Snowbirds Don't Fly" in the retitled Green Lantern / Green Arrow No. 85 (September 1971), which depicted Speedy, the teen sidekick of superhero archer Green Arrow, as having become a heroin addict.

Jenette Kahn, a former children's magazine publisher, replaced Infantino as editorial director in January 1976. As it happened, her first task even before being formally hired, was to convince Bill Sarnoff, the head of Warner Publishing, to keep DC as a publishing concern, as opposed to simply managing their licensing of their properties. With that established, DC had attempted to compete with the now-surging Marvel by dramatically increasing its output and attempting to win the market by flooding it. This included launching series featuring such new characters as Firestorm and Shade, the Changing Man, as well as an increasing array of non-superhero titles, in an attempt to recapture the pre-Wertham days of post-War comicdom.

DC Comics 
In 1977, the company officially changed its name to DC Comics. It had used the brand "Superman-DC" since the 1950s, and was colloquially known as DC Comics for years.

In June 1978, five months before the release of the first Superman movie, Kahn expanded the line further, increasing the number of titles and story pages, and raising the price from 35 cents to 50 cents. Most series received eight-page back-up features while some had full-length twenty-five-page stories. This was a move the company called the "DC Explosion". The move was not successful, however, and corporate parent Warner dramatically cut back on these largely unsuccessful titles, firing many staffers in what industry watchers dubbed "the DC Implosion". In September 1978, the line was dramatically reduced and standard-size books returned to 17-page stories but for a still increased 40 cents. By 1980, the books returned to 50 cents with a 25-page story count but the story pages replaced house ads in the books.

Seeking new ways to boost market share, the new team of publisher Kahn, vice president Paul Levitz, and managing editor Giordano addressed the issue of talent instability. To that end—and following the example of Atlas/Seaboard Comics and such independent companies as Eclipse Comics—DC began to offer royalties in place of the industry-standard work-for-hire agreement in which creators worked for a flat fee and signed away all rights, giving talent a financial incentive tied to the success of their work. As it happened, the implementation of these incentives proved opportune considering Marvel Comics' Editor-in-Chief, Jim Shooter, was alienating much of his company's creative staff with his authoritarian manner and major talents there went to DC like Roy Thomas, Gene Colan, Marv Wolfman, and George Perez.

In addition, emulating the era's new television form, the miniseries while addressing the matter of an excessive number of ongoing titles fizzling out within a few issues of their start, DC created the industry concept of the comic book limited series. This publishing format allowed for the deliberate creation of finite storylines within a more flexible publishing format that could showcase creations without forcing the talent into unsustainable open-ended commitments. The first such title was World of Krypton in 1979, and its positive results led to subsequent similar titles and later more ambitious productions like Camelot 3000 for the direct market in 1982.

These changes in policy shaped the future of the medium as a whole, and in the short term allowed DC to entice creators away from rival Marvel, and encourage stability on individual titles. In November 1980 DC launched the ongoing series The New Teen Titans, by writer Marv Wolfman and artist George Pérez, two popular talents with a history of success. Their superhero-team comic, superficially similar to Marvel's ensemble series X-Men, but rooted in DC history, earned significant sales in part due to the stability of the creative team, who both continued with the title for six full years. In addition, Wolfman and Pérez took advantage of the limited-series option to create a spin-off title, Tales of the New Teen Titans, to present origin stories of their original characters without having to break the narrative flow of the main series or oblige them to double their work load with another ongoing title.

Modern Age 

This successful revitalization of the Silver Age Teen Titans led DC's editors to seek the same for the wider DC Universe. The result, the Wolfman/Pérez 12-issue limited series Crisis on Infinite Earths, gave the company an opportunity to realign and jettison some of the characters' complicated backstory and continuity discrepancies. A companion publication, two volumes entitled The History of the DC Universe, set out the revised history of the major DC characters. Crisis featured many key deaths that shaped the DC Universe for the following decades, and it separated the timeline of DC publications into pre- and post-"Crisis".

Meanwhile, a parallel update had started in the non-superhero and horror titles. Since early 1984, the work of British writer Alan Moore had revitalized the horror series The Saga of the Swamp Thing, and soon numerous British writers, including Neil Gaiman and Grant Morrison, began freelancing for the company. The resulting influx of sophisticated horror-fantasy material led to DC in 1993 establishing the Vertigo mature-readers imprint, which did not subscribe to the Comics Code Authority.

Two DC limited series, Batman: The Dark Knight Returns by Frank Miller and Watchmen by Moore and artist Dave Gibbons, drew attention in the mainstream press for their dark psychological complexity and promotion of the antihero. These titles helped pave the way for comics to be more widely accepted in literary-criticism circles and to make inroads into the book industry, with collected editions of these series as commercially successful trade paperbacks.

The mid-1980s also saw the end of many long-running DC war comics, including series that had been in print since the 1960s. These titles, all with over 100 issues, included Sgt. Rock, G.I. Combat, The Unknown Soldier, and Weird War Tales.

Time Warner/AOL Time Warner (1990–2018) 
In March 1989, Warner Communications merged with Time Inc., making DC Comics a subsidiary of Time Warner. In June, the first Tim Burton-directed Batman movie was released, and DC began publishing its hardcover series of DC Archive Editions, collections of many of their early, key comics series, featuring rare and expensive stories unseen by many modern fans. Restoration for many of the Archive Editions was handled by Rick Keene with colour restoration by DC's long-time resident colourist, Bob LeRose. These collections attempted to retroactively credit many of the writers and artists who had worked without much recognition for DC during the early period of comics when individual credits were few and far between.

The comics industry experienced a brief boom in the early 1990s, thanks to a combination of speculative purchasing (mass purchase of the books as collectible items, with intent to resell at a higher value as the rising value of older issues, was thought to imply that all comics would rise dramatically in price) and several storylines which gained attention from the mainstream media. DC's extended storylines in which Superman was killed, Batman was crippled and superhero Green Lantern turned into the supervillain Parallax resulted in dramatically increased sales, but the increases were as temporary as the hero's replacements. Sales dropped off as the industry went into a major slump, while manufactured "collectables" numbering in the millions replaced quality with quantity until fans and speculators alike deserted the medium in droves.

DC's Piranha Press and other imprints (including the mature readers line Vertigo, and Helix, a short-lived science fiction imprint) were introduced to facilitate compartmentalized diversification and allow for specialized marketing of individual product lines. They increased the use of non-traditional contractual arrangements, including the dramatic rise of creator-owned projects, leading to a significant increase in critically lauded work (much of it for Vertigo) and the licensing of material from other companies. DC also increased publication of book-store friendly formats, including trade paperback collections of individual serial comics, as well as original graphic novels.

One of the other imprints was Impact Comics from 1991 to 1992 in which the Archie Comics superheroes were licensed and revamped. The stories in the line were part of its own shared universe.

DC entered into a publishing agreement with Milestone Media that gave DC a line of comics featuring a culturally and racially diverse range of superhero characters. Although the Milestone line ceased publication after a few years, it yielded the popular animated series Static Shock. DC established Paradox Press to publish material such as the large-format Big Book of... series of multi-artist interpretations on individual themes, and such crime fiction as the graphic novel Road to Perdition. In 1998, DC purchased WildStorm Comics, Jim Lee's imprint under the Image Comics banner, continuing it for many years as a wholly separate imprint – and fictional universe – with its own style and audience. As part of this purchase, DC also began to publish titles under the fledgling WildStorm sub-imprint America's Best Comics (ABC), a series of titles created by Alan Moore, including The League of Extraordinary Gentlemen, Tom Strong, and Promethea. Moore strongly contested this situation, and DC eventually stopped publishing ABC.

In March 2003 DC acquired publishing and merchandising rights to the long-running fantasy series Elfquest, previously self-published by creators Wendy and Richard Pini under their WaRP Graphics publication banner. This series then followed another non-DC title, Tower Comics' series T.H.U.N.D.E.R. Agents, in collection into DC Archive Editions. In 2004 DC temporarily acquired the North American publishing rights to graphic novels from European publishers 2000 AD and Humanoids. It also rebranded its younger-audience titles with the mascot Johnny DC and established the CMX imprint to reprint translated manga. In 2006, CMX took over from Dark Horse Comics publication of the webcomic Megatokyo in print form. DC also took advantage of the demise of Kitchen Sink Press and acquired the rights to much of the work of Will Eisner, such as his The Spirit series and his graphic novels.

In 2004, DC began laying the groundwork for a full continuity-reshuffling sequel to Crisis on Infinite Earths, promising substantial changes to the DC Universe (and side-stepping the 1994 Zero Hour event which similarly tried to ret-con the history of the DCU). In 2005, the critically lauded Batman Begins film was released; also, the company published several limited series establishing increasingly escalated conflicts among DC's heroes, with events climaxing in the Infinite Crisis limited series. Immediately after this event, DC's ongoing series jumped forward a full year in their in-story continuity, as DC launched a weekly series, 52, to gradually fill in the missing time. Concurrently, DC lost the copyright to "Superboy" (while retaining the trademark) when the heirs of Jerry Siegel used a provision of the 1976 revision to the copyright law to regain ownership.

In 2005, DC launched its "All-Star" line (evoking the title of the 1940s publication), designed to feature some of the company's best-known characters in stories that eschewed the long and convoluted continuity of the DC Universe. The line began with All-Star Batman & Robin the Boy Wonder and All-Star Superman, with All-Star Wonder Woman and All-Star Batgirl announced in 2006 but neither being released nor scheduled as of the end of 2009.

DC licensed characters from the Archie Comics imprint Red Circle Comics by 2007. They appeared in the Red Circle line, based in the DC Universe, with a series of one-shots followed by a miniseries that lead into two ongoing titles, each lasting 10 issues.

DC Entertainment 
In 2011, DC rebooted all of its running titles following the Flashpoint storyline. The reboot called The New 52 gave new origin stories and costume designs to many of DC's characters.

DC licensed pulp characters including Doc Savage and the Spirit which it then used, along with some DC heroes, as part of the First Wave comics line launched in 2010 and lasting through fall 2011.

In May 2011, DC announced it would begin releasing digital versions of their comics on the same day as paper versions.

On June 1, 2011, DC announced that it would end all ongoing series set in the DC Universe in August and relaunch its comic line with 52 issue #1s, starting with Justice League on August 31 (written by Geoff Johns and drawn by Jim Lee), with the rest to follow later on in September.

On June 4, 2013, DC unveiled two new digital comic innovations to enhance interactivity: DC2 and DC2 Multiverse. DC2 layers dynamic artwork onto digital comic panels, adding a new level of dimension to digital storytelling, while DC2 Multiverse allows readers to determine a specific story outcome by selecting individual characters, storylines and plot developments while reading the comic, meaning one digital comic has multiple outcomes. DC2 appeared in the digital-first title, Batman '66, based on the 1960s television series and DC2 Multiverse appeared in Batman: Arkham Origins, a digital-first title based on the video game of the same name.

In 2014, DC announced an eight-issue miniseries titled Convergence which began in April 2015.

In 2016, DC announced a line-wide relaunch titled DC Rebirth. The new line would launch with an 80-page one-shot titled DC Universe: Rebirth, written by Geoff Johns, with art from Gary Frank, Ethan Van Sciver, and more. After that, many new series would launch with a twice-monthly release schedule and new creative teams for nearly every title. The relaunch was meant to bring back the legacy and heart many felt had been missing from DC characters since the launch of the New 52. Rebirth brought huge success, both financially and critically.

WarnerMedia/Warner Bros. Discovery unit (2018–present) 
On February 21, 2020, the Co-Publisher of DC Comics, Dan DiDio stepped down after 10 years at that position. The company did not give a reason for the move, nor did it indicate whether it was his decision or the company's. The leadership change was the latest event in the company restructuring which began the previous month, as several top executives were laid off from the company. However, Bleeding Cool reported that he was fired.

In June 2020, Warner Bros. announced a separate DC-themed online-only convention. Known as DC FanDome, the free "immersive virtual fan experience" was a 24-hour-long event held on August 22, 2020. The main presentation, entitled "DC FanDome: Hall of Heroes", was held as scheduled on August 22. The remaining programming was provided through a one-day video on demand experience, "DC FanDome: Explore the Multiverse", on September 12.

As Warner Bros. and DC's response to San Diego Comic-Con's cancellation due to the COVID-19 pandemic, the convention featured information about DC-based content including the DC Extended Universe film franchise, the Arrowverse television franchise, comic books, and video games. The convention also returned for the virtual premiere of Wonder Woman 1984 and returned once again on October 16, 2021.

In August 2020, roughly one-third of DC's editorial ranks were laid off, including the editor-in-chief, senior story editor, executive editor, and several senior VPs.

In March 2021, DC relaunched their entire line once again under the banner of Infinite Frontier. After the events of the Dark Nights: Death Metal storyline, the DC Multiverse was expanded into a larger "Omniverse" where everything is canon, effectively reversing the changes The New 52 introduced a decade prior.

Furthermore, AT&T spun off WarnerMedia to Discovery, forming Warner Bros. Discovery. This merger was completed on April 8, 2022.

In January 2023, DC is set to relaunch their line under the banner of "Dawn of DC" following the conclusion of Dark Crisis on Infinite Earths and Lazarus Planet.

Logo 
 DC's first logo appeared on the April 1940 issues of its titles. The small logo, with no background, read simply, "A DC Publication".
 The November 1941 DC titles introduced an updated logo. This version was almost twice the size of the previous one and was the first version with a white background. The name "Superman" was added to "A DC Publication", effectively acknowledging both Superman and Batman. This logo was the first to occupy the top-left corner of the cover, where the logo has usually resided since. The company now referred to itself in its advertising as "Superman-DC".
 In November 1949, the logo was modified to incorporate the company's formal name, National Comics Publications. This logo also served as the round body of Johnny DC, DC's mascot in the 1960s.
 In October 1970, DC briefly retired the circular logo in favour of a simple "DC" in a rectangle with the name of the title, or the star of the book; the logo on many issues of Action Comics, for example, read "DC Superman". An image of the lead character either appeared above or below the rectangle. For books that did not have a single star, such as anthologies like House of Mystery or team series such as Justice League of America, the title and "DC" appeared in a stylized logo, such as a bat for "House of Mystery". This use of characters as logos helped to establish the likenesses as trademarks, and was similar to Marvel's contemporaneous use of characters as part of its cover branding.
 DC's "100 Page Super-Spectacular" titles and later 100-page and "Giant" issues published from 1972 to 1974 featured a logo exclusive to these editions: the letters "DC" in a simple sans-serif typeface within a circle. A variant had the letters in a square.
 The July 1972 DC titles featured a new circular logo. The letters "DC" were rendered in a block-like typeface that remained through later logo revisions until 2005. The title of the book usually appeared inside the circle, either above or below the letters.
 In December 1973, this logo was modified with the addition of the words "The Line of DC Super-Stars" and the star motif that continued in later logos. This logo was placed in the top center of the cover from August 1975 to October 1976.
 When Jenette Kahn became DC's publisher in late 1976, she commissioned graphic designer Milton Glaser to design a new logo. Popularly referred to as the "DC bullet", this logo premiered on the February 1977 titles. Although it varied in size and colour and was at times cropped by the edges of the cover, or briefly rotated 4 degrees, it remained essentially unchanged for nearly three decades. Despite logo changes since 2005, the old "DC bullet" continues to be used only on the DC Archive Editions series.
 On May 8, 2005, a new logo (dubbed the "DC spin") was unveiled, debuting on DC titles in June 2005 with DC Special: The Return of Donna Troy No. 1 and the rest of the titles the following week. In addition to comics, it was designed for DC properties in other media, which was used for movies since Batman Begins, with Superman Returns showing the logo's normal variant, and the TV series Smallville, the animated series Justice League Unlimited and others, as well as for collectibles and other merchandise. The logo was designed by Josh Beatman of Brainchild Studios and DC executive Richard Bruning.
 In March 2012, DC unveiled a new logo consisting of the letter "D" flipping back to reveal the letter "C" and "DC ENTERTAINMENT".
 DC Entertainment announced a new identity and logo for another iconic DC Comics universe brand on May 17, 2016. The new logo was first used on May 25, 2016, in conjunction with the release of DC Universe: Rebirth Special #1 by Geoff Johns.

Gallery

Imprints

Active 
 DC (1937–present)
 Young Animal (2016–present)
 WildStorm (1999–2010, 2017–present)
 Earth-M (1993–1997, 2018–present)
 DC Black Label (2018–present)
 Sandman Universe (2018–present)
 Hill House Comics (2019–present)
 Wonder Comics (2019–present)
 DC Graphic Novels for Young Adults (2020–present)
 DC Graphic Novels for Kids (2020–present)
 Mad (1953–present)

Defunct 
 DC Archive Editions (1989–2014; replaced by DC Omnibus)
 Elseworlds (1989–2004)
 Piranha Press (1989–1993; renamed Paradox Press)
 Impact Comics (1991–1993; licensed from Archie Comics)
 Vertigo (1993–2019)
 Amalgam Comics (1996–1997; jointly with Marvel Comics)
 Helix (1996–1998; merged with Vertigo)
 Tangent Comics (1997–1998)
 Paradox Press (1998–2003)
 WildStorm Productions (1999–2010)
 America's Best Comics (1999–2005)
 Homage Comics (1999–2004; merged to form WildStorm Signature)
 Cliffhanger (1999–2004; merged to form WildStorm Signature)
 WildStorm Signature (2004–2006; merged with main WildStorm line)
 CMX Manga (2004–2010)
 DC Focus (2004–2005; merged with main DC line)
 Johnny DC (2004–2012)
 All Star (2005–2008)
 Minx (2007–2008)
 Zuda Comics (2007–2010)
 First Wave (2010–2011; licensed from Condé Nast Publications and Will Eisner Library)
 DC Ink (2019–2019; replaced by DC Graphic Novels for Young Adults)
 DC Zoom (2019–2019; replaced by DC Graphic Novels for Kids)

See also 

 Batman Day (September 17)
 DC Collectibles
 DC Cosmic Cards
 DC Extended Universe
 DC Studios
 List of comics characters which originated in other media
 List of current DC Comics publications
 List of DC Comics characters
 List of films based on DC Comics publications
 List of television series based on DC Comics publications
 List of unproduced DC Comics projects
 List of video games based on DC Comics
 Publication history of DC Comics crossover events

Notes

Citations

Sources

External links 

 
 
 
 Mike's Amazing World of Comics
 DC Database | Fandom

 
Book publishing companies based in California
Companies based in Burbank, California
Publishing companies established in 1934
DC Entertainment
Warner Bros. Discovery brands
Comic book publishing companies of the United States
American companies established in 1934
American culture
1934 establishments in New York City
Warner Bros. Discovery subsidiaries